Angelina Sergeyevna Danilova (Russian: Ангелина Сергеевна Данилова, Korean: 안젤리나 다닐로바) is a Russian singer, model, actress and TV personality active in South Korea. She made her solo singing debut with the digital single "As You Are" on January 17, 2020. She was the 2018 recipient of the Korea Image Flower Stone Award for her work on promoting Korea to the world.

Biography

Early life
Danilova was born in Saint Petersburg, Russia. She studied interior design at the Saint Petersburg State University of Industrial Technology and Design.

Career
In 2015, Danilova began a meteoric rise to fame when a Korean user reposted an image of her from 2014 to the Korean social networking site Naver with the caption "Russian model who wants to marry a Korean man". The post quickly went viral in Korea across all media platforms.

In 2016, Palette Media scouted Danilova through her Instagram, and invited her to Korea as a main cast member for the reality survival show Babel 250, in which she lived with six other participants from across the globe and tried to establish friendships while breaking cultural and linguistic barriers.

Since her appearance on the show, Danilova has met with success in Korean media and has appeared in over 10 television shows in the span of 3 years. She has featured in numerous modelling campaigns and music videos. In 2018, she appeared as Cinderella in the film New Old Story.

Danilova was featured in a 2016 music video for the song "Eyescream" by Hanhae. She later appeared in the music video for "Heart pound (쿵쾅대)" by Eddy Kim and in "우사인볼트 / Usain Bolt" by Swings and Han Yo Han.

On April 18, 2019, Danilova was a featured singer on Won Jang's second digital single, "Sorry".

On January 14, 2020, Angelina released a teaser clip on her Instagram to announce her debut as a singer. She made her debut with the ballad digital single "As You Are" on January 17, 2020.

As of July 2020, Danilova has over 1 million followers on her Instagram page, many of whom are not Korean. The influence Danilova wields in promoting Korean culture online has been a contributing factor in the spread of the Hallyu Wave throughout Western social media.

The Corea Image Communication Institute (CICI), a nonprofit organization that promotes Korean culture abroad, awarded Danilova as the 2018 recipient of the Korea Image Flower Stone Award for her work promoting Korea to the world. Fellow recipients that day included Sohn Kyung-shik, chairman of CJ Group, the food and media conglomerate, and Joachim Son-Forget, the first Korean-born member of the French National Assembly. Past award winners of CICI Korea Image Awards include K-pop stars Psy and Rain, maestro Chung Myung-whun, and former Secretary-General of the United Nations Ban Ki-moon.

Personal life 
Danilova's interest in Korean culture began when she watched a video from Fine Brothers Entertainment titled "YouTubers React to K-pop".

She uploads videos to her YouTube channel (currently amassing more than 200K subscribers).

Danilova speaks five languages; Russian, English, Serbian, Korean and Italian.

Danilova is frequently called "elf" or "goddess" by her Korean fans, but in a 2016 Instagram post she spoke out against being seen only for her appearance, writing: "Don't call me beautiful, I don't care. Call me intelligent. Tell me my laugh is contagious. Tell me I have something."

She has stated her hobbies include: dancing, singing, playing ukulele, listening to music, fashion, traveling, horse riding, snowboarding, kite surfing, drawing and filming videos. One of her artistic aspirations is music composition.

Controversy 
In 2018, Danilova left Palette Media and joined her current agency the Prizm Entertainment. Palette Media accused her of fraud, and filed a complaint with the  Seoul High Prosecutors' Office against Danilova, accusing her of failing to fulfil her contractual obligations and entering into a contract with another agency without Palette Media's agreement. Palette Media claimed it made an exclusive three-year (2016-2019) contract with Danilova, who rose to fame on social media as "the most beautiful K-pop fan". Palette Media alleged that she took part in promotional events and received sponsorship on several occasions without the agency's permission. Separately, the agency said it has filed a damages suit against her for her "illegal commercial activities."

Filmography

Movie

Drama television series

Reality television series

Discography

Radio broadcast

Music video

Digital single

Features

Modeling

Advertising

Pictorial

Awards

Model career 
 Sky Model Agency Professional Model
 2017 F /W Hera Seoul Fashion Week Fashion Show Model
 2017 Fashion Magazine The Naver Model

Actress career

References

External links

 Angelina Danilova on YouTube.

1996 births
21st-century Russian actresses
21st-century Russian women singers
21st-century Russian singers
Actresses from Saint Petersburg
Female models from Saint Petersburg
Living people
Russian expatriates in South Korea
Russian film actresses
Russian television actresses
Saint Petersburg State Institute of Technology alumni
Singers from Saint Petersburg